Druze in Syria is a significant minority religion. According to The World Factbook, Druze make up about 3.2 percent of the population of Syria (as of 2010), or approximately 700,000 persons, including residents of the Golan Heights. The Druzites are concentrated in the rural, mountainous areas east and south of Damascus in the area known officially as the Jabal al-Druze.

Druze is a monotheistic and Abrahamic religion. Syria has the largest Druzite population in the world, and many Syrian Druzites also living abroad, particularly in Venezuela, who have been living there for over the past hundred years.

History

Druze is an Abrahamic monotheistic religion that is a gnostic offshoot and Neoplatonist sect of Isma'ilism, a branch of Shia Islam. The Druze evolved from the religion of Islam and now are an independent religion, separate from Islam.

The Druzites follow a batini or esoteric interpretation of the Five Pillars of Islam. Some modern scholars and the Amman Message identify them as Muslims. However, some Muslims disagree, noting that since they do not practice exoteric interpretations, "fasting during the month of Ramadan and making a pilgrimage to Mecca. Thus, they are not regarded by Muslims as Islamic".

The Druze follow a lifestyle of isolation where no conversion is allowed, neither out of nor into, the religion. When Druze live among people of other religions, they try to blend in, in order to protect their religion and their own safety. They can pray as Muslims, or as Christians, depending on where they are. This system is apparently changing in modern times, where more security has allowed Druze to be more open about their religious belonging.

The Tanukhids inaugurated the Druze community in Syria when most of them accepted and adopted the new message that was being preached in the 11th century, due to their leaderships close ties with Fatimid caliph al-Hakim bi-Amr Allah.

Historically the relationship between the Druze and Muslims has been characterized by intense persecution. The Druze faith is often classified as a branch of Isma'ili. Even though the faith originally developed out of Ismaili Islam, most Druze do not identify as Muslims, and they do not accept the five pillars of Islam. The Druze have frequently experienced persecution by different Muslim regimes such as the Shia Fatimid Caliphate, Sunni Ottoman Empire, and Egypt Eyalet. The persecution of the Druze included massacres, demolishing Druze prayer houses and holy places, and forced conversion to Islam. Those were no ordinary killings in the Druze's narrative, they were meant to eradicate the whole community according to the Druze narrative.

The Druze community in Syria played an important role in the formation of the modern state of Syria, and even though they are a minority they play an important role in the Syrian political scene.

In Syria, most Druze live in the Jabal al-Druze, a rugged and mountainous region in the southwest of the country, which is more than 90 percent Druze inhabited; some 120 villages are exclusively so. Other notable communities live in the Harim Mountains, the Damascus suburb of Jaramana, and on the southeast slopes of Mount Hermon. A large Syrian Druze community historically lived in the Golan Heights, but following wars with Israel in 1967 and 1973, many of these Druze fled to other parts of Syria; most of those who remained to live in a handful of villages in the disputed zone, while only a few live in the narrow remnant of Quneitra Governorate that is still under effective Syrian control.

The Druze always played a far more important role in Syrian politics than its comparatively small population would suggest. With a community of little more than 100,000 in 1949 or roughly three percent of the Syrian population, the Druze of Syria's southwestern mountains constituted a potent force in Syrian politics and played a leading role in the nationalist struggle against the French. Under the military leadership of Sultan al-Atrash, the Druze provided much of the military force behind the Great Syrian Revolt of 1925–27. In 1945, Amir Hasan al-Atrash, the paramount political leader of the Jabal Druze State, led the Druze military units in a successful revolt against the French, making the Jebel al-Druze the first and only region in Syria to liberate itself from French rule without British assistance. At independence, the Druze made confident by their successes, expected that Damascus would reward them for their many sacrifices on the battlefield. They demanded to keep their autonomous administration and many political privileges accorded them by the French and sought generous economic assistance from the newly independent government.

When a local paper in 1945 reported that President Shukri al-Quwatli (1943–49) had called the Druzes a "dangerous minority", Sultan Pasha al-Atrash flew into a rage and demanded a public retraction. If it were not forthcoming, he announced, the Druzes would indeed become "dangerous" and a force of 4,000 Druze warriors would "occupy the city of Damascus." Quwwatli could not dismiss Sultan Pasha's threat. The military balance of power in Syria was tilted in favor of the Druzes, at least until the military builds up during the 1948 War in Palestine. One advisor to the Syrian Defense Department warned in 1946 that the Syrian army was "useless", and that the Druzes could "take Damascus and capture the present leaders in a breeze."

During the four years of Adib Shishakli's rule in Syria (December 1949 to February 1954) (on 25 August 1952: Shishakli created the Arab Liberation Movement (ALM), a progressive party with pan-Arabist and socialist views), the Druze community was subjected to a heavy attack by the Syrian government. Shishakli believed that among his many opponents in Syria, the Druzes were the most potentially dangerous, and he was determined to crush them. He frequently proclaimed: "My enemies are like a serpent: the head is the Jebel al-Druze, the stomach Homs, and the tail Aleppo. If I crush the head the serpent will die." Shishakli dispatched 10,000 regular troops to occupy the Jebel al-Druze. Several towns were bombarded with heavy weapons, killing scores of civilians and destroying many houses. According to Druze accounts, Shishakli encouraged neighboring bedouin tribes to plunder the defenseless population and allowed his own troops to run amok.

Shishakli launched a campaign to defame the Druzes for their religion and politics. He accused the entire community of treason, at times claiming they were agents of the British and Hashemites, at others that they were fighting for Israel against the Arabs. He even produced a cache of Israeli weapons allegedly discovered in the Jabal. Even more painful for the Druze community was his publication of "falsified Druze religious texts" and false testimonials ascribed to leading Druze sheikhs designed to stir up sectarian hatred. This propaganda also was broadcast in the Arab world, mainly Egypt. Shishakli was assassinated in Brazil on 27 September 1964 by a Druze seeking revenge for Shishakli's bombardment of the Jebel al-Druze.

He forcibly integrated minorities into the national Syrian social structure; his "Syrianization" of Alawi and Druze territories had to be accomplished in part using violence. To this end, al-Shishakli encouraged the stigmatization of minorities. He saw minority demands as tantamount to treason. His increasingly chauvinistic notions of Arab nationalism were predicated on the denial that "minorities" existed in Syria.

After the Shishakli's military campaign, the Druze community lost a lot of its political influence, but many Druze military officers played an important role when it comes to the Ba'ath government currently ruling Syria.

In 1967, a community of Druze in the Golan Heights came under Israeli control, today about 20,000 strong. The Qalb Loze massacre was a reported massacre of 20-24 Syrian Druze on 10 June 2015 in the village of Qalb Loze in Syria's northwestern Idlib Governorate. On 25 July 2018, a group of Islamic State-affiliated attackers entered the Druze city of as-Suwayda and initiated a series of gunfights and suicide bombings on its streets killing at least 258 people, the vast majority of them civilians. See 2018 As-Suwayda attacks for further information.

Demographics

According to scholar Colbert C. Held of University of Nebraska, Lincoln the number of Druze people worldwide is around one million, with about 45% to 50% live in Syria, 35% to 40% live in Lebanon, and less than 10% live in Israel, with recently there has been a growing Druze diaspora. The Syrian Druze are Arabic in language and culture, and their mother tongue is the Arabic Language. The Druze Arabic dialect, especially in the rural areas, is often different from the other regional Syrian Arabic dialects. Druze Arabic dialect is distinguished from others by retention of the phoneme /qāf/.

The Druze are concentrated in the rural, mountainous areas east and south of Damascus in the area known officially as Jabal al-Druze. The Syrian Druze are estimated to constitute 3.2% of Syria's population of approximately 23 million, which means they amount to between 700 and 736 thousand people.

Before the Syrian civil war, its been estimated that around 700,000 Druze were living in Syria in 2010, or around 3% of the Syrian population. Around 337,5000 Druze lived in As-Suwayda Governorate (or 48.2% of total Syrian Druze), the only governorate in Syria that has a Druze majority (around 90%). While 250,000 Druze (or 35.7%) lived in Damascus and its outskirts (such as Jaramana, Sahnaya, and Jdeidat Artouz), and around 30,000 Druze lived in the east side of Mount Hermon, and around 25,000 Druze lived in 14 villages in Jabal al-Summaq in Idlib Governorate.

There are many Syrian Druze also living abroad, particularly in Latin America, who have been living there for over the past hundred years. In Venezuela, there are approximately 60,000 Druze of Syrian origin.

By one estimate made by Elisabet Granli from University of Oslo, around 1,920 Syrian Druze converted to Christianity, according to the same study Christian of Druze background (Druze converts to Christianity) still regard themselves as Druze, and they claims that there is no contradiction between being Druze and being Christian.

Notable people
 Most prominent Druze families in Syria are: al-Atrash and Al Hamdan.

Politicians
Sultan al-Atrash. 
Hilal al-Atrash, Minister of local administration and environment (2000-2009)
Mansur al-Atrash
Shibli al-Aysami, Vice President of Syria (1965-1966)
Salim Hatum

Singers
Asmahan
Farid al-Atrash
Fahd Ballan

Actors
Naji Jaber
Lilia al-Atrash

Jumana Murad

Sports
Raja Rafe

Miscellaneous
Faisal al-Qassem, Talk show host
Ziad Hamzeh, film director
Nawaf Ghazaleh
Issam Zahreddine, military officer
, anchorwoman
Hassan Al Kontar, Syrian refugee

See also
 Jabal al-Druze
 Druze
 Islam in Syria
 Religion in Syria
 Jabal Druze State
 Jaysh al-Muwahhideen

References

Religion in Syria